Pukë District was one of the 36 districts of Albania, which were dissolved in July 2000 and replaced by 12 newly created counties. It is located in the north of the country and its capital was the town of Pukë. Its territory is now part of Shkodër County: the municipalities of Fushë-Arrëz and Pukë.

Administrative divisions
The district consisted of the following municipalities:
Blerim
Fierzë
Fushë-Arrëz
Gjegjan
Iballë
Pukë
Qafë-Mali
Qelëz
Qerret
Rrapë

References

Districts of Albania
Geography of Shkodër County